The Minneapolis Saint Paul Rochester & Dubuque Electric Traction Company Depot or Orchard Gardens Railway Station, located at County Road 5 and 155th Street in Burnsville in the U.S. state of Minnesota was built in 1910 on the Dan Patch Line, later known as the Minneapolis, Northfield and Southern Railway. Connecting Northfield and Minneapolis, the line carried agricultural produce from rural Dakota County to urban markets. When Orchard Gardens in Burnsville was platted in 1910, this small depot was added for the area's passengers. Orchard Gardens farmers grew onions, apples, and flowers, and produced eggs and milk until the Great Depression caused locals to find employment in Minneapolis. Then the station attracted more commuters than farmers.

References

Buildings and structures in Dakota County, Minnesota
Burnsville, Minnesota
Former railway stations in Minnesota
National Register of Historic Places in Dakota County, Minnesota
Railway stations on the National Register of Historic Places in Minnesota
Railway stations in the United States opened in 1910